Quirino Gasparini (24 October 1721 – 26 September 1778) was an Italian composer, born in Gandino, near Bergamo, Italy. He studied for the priesthood, but largely devoted his life to music, becoming maestro de capello at Turin's cathedral. His compositions are mainly of church music, including a Stabat Mater which is still performed occasionally. He also wrote several operas, including a 1767 setting of Vittorio Amadeo Cigna-Santi's libretto Mitridate, re di Ponto, which three years later was set by the 14-year-old Wolfgang Amadeus Mozart for the 1770 Milan carnival.

One of Gasparini's arias, preferred by the tenor singer over Mozart's version of it, was sung at the Milan performance and is still included in modern publications of the opera's score.  According to some accounts, Gasparini tried to subvert the Milan prima donna Antonia Bernasconi, attempting to persuade her to sing his settings of her arias rather than Mozart's. His ruse was, however, unsuccessful. He died in Turin in 1778.

References

Sources

External links

1721 births
1778 deaths
Italian male classical composers
Pupils of Giovanni Battista Martini
Italian opera composers
Male opera composers
18th-century Italian Roman Catholic priests
18th-century Italian composers
18th-century Italian male musicians